Following is a list of dams and reservoirs in Iowa.

All major dams are linked below.

Dams and reservoirs in Iowa 

This list is incomplete.  You can help Wikipedia by expanding it.

 Coralville Dam, Coralville Lake, United States Army Corps of Engineers
 Dale Maffitt Dam, Dale Maffitt Reservoir, Des Moines Water Works 
 Delhi Dam, Lake Delhi, locally owned (breached 2010)
 Lake Icaria Dam, Lake Icaria, Adams County Soil and Water Conservation District
 Lock and Dam No. 9, Big Lake and Lake Winneshiek, USACE
 Lock and Dam No. 10, Mississippi River, USACE
 Lock and Dam No. 11, Mississippi River, USACE
 Lock and Dam No. 12, Mississippi River, USACE
 Lock and Dam No. 13, Lake Clinton, USACE
 Lock and Dam No. 14, Mississippi River, USACE
 Lock and Dam No. 15, Mississippi River, USACE
 Lock and Dam No. 16, Mississippi River, USACE
 Lock and Dam No. 17, Mississippi River, USACE
 Lock and Dam No. 18, Mississippi River, USACE
 Lock and Dam No. 19, Mississippi River, USACE
 Rathbun Dam, Rathbun Lake, USACE
 Red Rock Dam, Lake Red Rock, USACE
 Saylorville Dam, Saylorville Lake, USACE
 Three Mile Reservoir Dam, Three Mile Reservoir, Three Mile Reservoir Agency

References 

 
 
Iowa
Dams
Dams